"Sunset Strip" is a song written by Roger Waters for his second studio album, Radio K.A.O.S. It was placed as the fifth track on the record. It was also released as the album's second single, in September 1987.

Background
Billy is a young man with a disability. He uses a wheelchair and is thought to be incapable of speech. However, Billy is highly intelligent and gifted, and can hear radio waves in his head. He begins to explore the cordless phone, recognising its similarity to a radio. He experiments with a phone which his brother, Benny, now in prison, hid in his wheelchair after burgling an electronics shop. Through it Billy is able to access computers and speech synthesisers and learns to speak through them. He calls a radio station in Los Angeles named "Radio KAOS" and tells the DJ of his life story. "Sunset Strip" is about Billy's sister-in-law, Molly not being able to cope and sending him to L.A. to live with his uncle Dave. During the song Billy expresses his longing for home and the song mentions various things associated with Wales, such as the Red Dragon, male voice choirs, the land of his fathers and the Black Fields.

Track listings

Charts

See also 
 Sunset Strip

References

External links
 Sunset Strip Discogs
 Roger Waters official website

1987 songs
Roger Waters songs
Songs written by Roger Waters

ka:Radio Waves